Lady, Let's Dance is a 1944 black-and-white film directed by Frank Woodruff that was nominated for two Oscars. Produced by Monogram Studios, the film is unique as an ice skating musical.

Lady, Let's Dance stars ice skater Belita as herself, James Ellison, and Walter Catlett.  Appearances also include ice skating artists Myrtle Godfrey and the renowned comedy ice team Werner Groebli & Hansruedi (Hans) Mauch (more commonly known as Frick and Frack).

The plot focuses on Belita as she travels to a California resort, where she is unexpectedly hired as a last minute dance team replacement. She becomes a national star while the handsome resort manager gets fired and becomes a drifter, until he ends up in the Army.

Edward Kay's Oscar-nominated score included: "Golden Dreams", "Silver Shadows", "In the Days of Beau Brummel", "Ten Million Men and a Girl", "Dream of Dreams", "Rio", "Happy Hearts", "Esperanza", and the title song "Lady, Let's Dance".

Myrtle Godfrey sported the same green bonnet with ostrich plume worn by Vivien Leigh in Gone with the Wind.

Cast
Belita as herself
James Ellison as Jerry Gibson
Walter Catlett as Timber Applegate
Barbara Woodell as Dolores (Mamie Potts)
Lucien Littlefield as Mr. Snodgrass 
Emmett Vogan as Stack
Harry Harvey as Fraser
Jack Rice as Given
Werner Groebli as himself (a.k.a. 'Frick' – Frick and Frack)
Hans Mauch as himself (a.k.a. 'Frack' – Frick and Frack)
Eugene Mikeler as himself 
Maurice St. Clair as Manuelo
Mitchell Ayres And His Orchestra
Lou Bring And His Orchestra
Henry Busse And His Orchestra
Eddie Le Baron And His Orchestra
Myrtle Godfrey as herself (Ice Skating artist)

See also
List of American films of 1944

References

External links 
 
 Lady, Let's Dance on Facebook

1944 films
Figure skating films
Monogram Pictures films
1944 musical films
American musical films
American black-and-white films
Films directed by Frank Woodruff
1940s American films